Rameshwor Raya Yadav is a Nepalese politician, and Minister of Labour, Employment and Social Security.

References

Living people
Government ministers of Nepal
Place of birth missing (living people)
Nepal MPs 2017–2022
Nepal Communist Party (NCP) politicians
Communist Party of Nepal (Maoist Centre) politicians
Members of the National Assembly (Nepal)
Nepal Sadbhawana Party politicians
Madhesi Jana Adhikar Forum, Nepal politicians
1955 births